is a district of Shibuya, Tokyo, Japan.

As of October 2020, the population of this district is 1,197. The postal code for Hachiyamachō is 150–0035.

Geography
Hachiyamachō borders Nanpeidaichō in the north, Uguisudanichō to the east, Sarugakuchō to the south, and Aobadai to the west.

Places of interest

Embassies
 Embassy of Guinea (Hachiyamachō 12-9)
Embassy of Uganda (Hachiyamachō 9-23)

Schools
High schools from the Tokyo Metropolitan Board of Education:
  (東京都立第一商業高等学校) (Hachiyamachō 8-1)

 operates public elementary and junior high schools.

All of Hachiyamachō is zoned to Sarugaku Elementary School (猿楽小学校), and Hachiyama Junior High School (鉢山中学校).

References

Neighborhoods of Tokyo
Shibuya